Ladainha is a Brazilian municipality located in the northeast of the state of Minas Gerais. Its population  was estimated to be 18,193 people living in a total area of 865 km2. The city belongs to the mesoregion of Vale do Mucuri and to the microregion of Teófilo Otoni.  It became a municipality in 1949.

Ladainha is located on the Rio Mucuri at an elevation of 670 meters, 65 km. northwest of Teófilo Otoni.  The distance to the state capital, Belo Horizonte, is 515 km.   Neighboring  municipalities are:  Novo Cruzeiro, Malacacheta, Poté, Teófilo Otoni, and Itaipé.

The settlement began in 1926 with the building of 61 houses for the workers on the Bahia-Minas railroad. The railway station was called Ladainha do Podô, due to an old man called Podô who was known for saying his rosary, called "ladainha" in Portuguese.

The main economic activities are services, small industries, and agriculture.  A large percentage of the population is in the rural area and engaged in subsistence farming.  The GDP in 2005 was R$33 million, with 24 million from services, 3 million from industry, and 5 million from agriculture.  There were 2,330 rural producers on 35,000 hectares of land.  Only 15 farms had tractors (2006).  Approximately 6,300 persons were dependent on agriculture.  The main crops were bananas, coffee, sugarcane, beans and corn.  There were 14,000 head of cattle (2006).  There was one bank (2007) and 312 automobiles (598 motorcycles), giving a ratio of 53 inhabitants per automobile.

There were 5 health clinics and 1 hospital with 23 beds.  Patients with more serious health conditions are transported to Teófilo Otoni.  Educational needs were met by 24 primary schools, 2 middle schools, and 1 pre-primary school.  There was a campus of the PUC Minas with less than 100 students in 2006.

Municipal Human Development Index: 0.609 (2000)
State ranking: 820 out of 853 municipalities 
National ranking: 4,506 out of 5,138 municipalities  
Literacy rate: 60%
Life expectancy: 66 (average of males and females)

In 2000 the per capita monthly income of R$72.00 was well below the state and national average of R$276.00 and R$297.00 respectively.

The highest ranking municipality in Minas Gerais in 2000 was Poços de Caldas with 0.841, while the lowest was Setubinha with 0.568.  Nationally the highest was São Caetano do Sul in São Paulo with 0.919, while the lowest was Setubinha.  In more recent statistics (considering 5,507 municipalities) Manari in the state of Pernambuco has the lowest rating in the country—0,467—putting it in last 
place.

Percentage of population aged less than 5 years old:  12.22 (2000)
Percentage of population aged 10 to 19: 26.67
Percentage of population aged 60 or more: 9.27
Percentage of urbanization: 25.16
Percentage of urban residences connected to sewage system: 33.10
Infant mortality rate: 17.39 (in 1,000 live births)

References

See also
 List of municipalities in Minas Gerais

Municipalities in Minas Gerais